2022 Iowa Amendment 1 was an amendment to the Constitution of Iowa that passed on November 8, 2022, via a statewide referendum concurrent with other elections across the state. This amendment adds a provision to the constitution of Iowa declaring that there is a fundamental individual right to keep and bear arms and establishes that any state laws regarding guns "shall be subject to strict scrutiny".

References

Question 1
Iowa Question 1
Iowa ballot measures